The Big Deal is a 1961 Australian TV play. Australian TV drama was relatively rare at the time.

Plot
Herbie, a despatch worker at a plastics factory, dreams of being a millionaire, but he lacks the killer instinct. His friend Julian dreams of creating novelties from plastic.

Cast
Donald Crosby as Herbie Schiff
Marie Renshaw as Lillian
Edward Howell as Solly Parness
Ken Goodlet as Julian Ring
Morton Smith as Al Konits
Diana Bell as Ginger
Brenda Beddison as Claire
Keith Hudon as Ralph
Roland Renshaw
Campbell Copelin
Carole Potter
Nancy Cato
James Lynch

Production
The play had been broadcast in London and New York but this was its first production in Australia.  Brenda Beddison and Morton Smith made their debuts in "live" drama. Eight studio sets were constructed by Kevin Bartlett.

Reception
The critic from the Sydney Morning Herald thought the play was "neither comical, subtle, ironic, nor in fact even,remotely entertaining" having "no plot worthy of the name, and its theme, tenuous to say the least, gained nothing from the hourlong treatment" with "dialogue of unrelieved stodginess, produced without imagination, dramatic sense or photographic skill."

References

External links

Australian drama television films
1961 television plays
Films directed by William Sterling (director)